Susan N. Herman (born 1947) is an American constitutional law scholar and presided as president of the American Civil Liberties Union from October 2008 to January 2021. Herman has taught at Brooklyn Law School since 1980.

Early life and education
Herman was born in Brooklyn and raised on Long Island. Herman earned a Bachelor of Arts degree in philosophy from Barnard College in 1968 and a Juris Doctor from the New York University School of Law, where she was a note and comment editor for the New York University Law Review.

Herman served as pro se law clerk for the United States Court of Appeals for the Second Circuit. She was a staff attorney and later associate director for Prisoners' Legal Services of New York.

Career
Herman teaches constitutional law and criminal procedure, seminars on law and literature, and terrorism and civil liberties, at Brooklyn Law School where she is the inaugural Ruth Bader Ginsburg Professor of Law.

She began working for the ACLU as an intern in law school. When she was elected president, Herman was the organization's general counsel and had served on its board for 20 years.

Herman's book Taking Liberties: the War on Terror and the Erosion of American Democracy was published by Oxford University Press in October 2011, and won the 2012 Chicago-Kent College of Law/Roy C. Palmer Civil Liberties Prize.

Herman has appeared as a guest on NPR, PBS, C-SPAN, NBC News, and MSNBC. She has written opinion columns for The New York Times, Time, Newsday, and HuffPost.

In 2019, Herman was named to Crain's New York Business biennial list of the "Most Powerful Women in New York".

Personal life
Herman is married to Paul Gangsei, a law partner at Manatt, Phelps & Phillips. They have one daughter.

Notes

External links
 Herman's profile at the ACLU website
 Susan Herman blog posts, ACLU Blog
 
 Appearance on "Office Hours" (William and Mary Law Pod Cast) https://soundcloud.com/user-36623013/office-hours-aclu-uncensored

1947 births
Living people
American legal scholars
American women lawyers
Barnard College alumni
Brooklyn Law School faculty
Law clerks
New York University School of Law alumni
Presidents of the American Civil Liberties Union
21st-century American women